

V
 VAEX - Vale Railway (Vale Canada Limited) 
 VALE - Valley Railroad (Connecticut)
 VALX - Sierra Pacific Power Company; Idaho Power Company
 VAPX - Dominion Energy (formerly Virginia Power)
 VC   - Virginia Central Railway
 VCSX - Virginia Chemicals, Inc.
 VCTX - Venture Chemical Company
 VCY  - Ventura County Railway
 VE   - Visalia Electric Railroad
 VENX - GE Rail Services
 VGN  - Virginian Railway; Norfolk Southern
 VGPX - Valley Grain Products
 VIA  - Via Rail
 VIAX - VIAX, Inc.
 VICX - Vista Chemical Company
 VLIX - Vintage Locomotive, Inc.
 VMCX - The Commonwealth Plan, Inc.
 VMEX - Vernor Materials Equipment Company
 VMMX - Vulcan Materials Company (Metals Division)
  VMSX - VALERO MARKETING & SUPPLY CO. 
 VOLX - GE Rail Services
 VOTX - Volunteer Trailblazers, Inc.
 VR   - Valdosta Railway
 VRRC - Vandalia Railroad
 VSC  - Vitebsk Seaway and Continental Railway, Lincoln Pacific Railway
 VS   - Valley and Siletz Railroad
 VSO  - Valdosta Southern Railroad
 VSOR - Vicksburg Southern Railroad (Watco)
 VSX - Virginia Smelting Co.
 VT   - Virginia and Truckee Railroad
 VTR  - Vermont Railway
 VUHX - Wagner Mills, Inc.
 VULX - Vulcan Materials Company (Southeast Division)
 VWCX - Vernon Warehouse Company

V